Elsa Oderholz is a Swiss retired slalom canoeist who competed from the late 1940s to the mid-1950s.  She won two medals in the folding K-1 team event at the ICF Canoe Slalom World Championships with a silver in 1949 and a bronze in 1951.

References

Swiss female canoeists
Possibly living people
Year of birth missing
Medalists at the ICF Canoe Slalom World Championships